Marco Sfogli (born April 4, 1980) is an Italian heavy metal and rock guitarist. He's the guitar player for James LaBrie, PFM and Icefish. He appeared on several albums.

History
Born in 1980, his first attempt with music came in 1984 when he played with his parents (both musicians) in Schwetzingen, Germany during an encore. In 1989 when he received his first Washburn electric guitar as a gift. He started to play along with his heroes (Michael Jackson, Van Halen, Europe). In 1992 he left the guitar to study the drums: "Being a drummer first and a guitarist second, helped me a lot in terms of creativity and rhythmic knowledge." In 1996 he left the drums because of his growing interest in guitar, especially after an intense listening of Images and Words by Dream Theater. Today, he's a guitar player, a composer and an arranger. He has worked for a lot of artists since. In 2005 he flew to Canada to record James LaBrie's third solo release titled Elements of Persuasion which has become a hit with progressive metal fans. Now member of the James LaBrie band, he put out his first solo record titled There's Hope on Feb. 15th 2008 through Lion Music. In 2010 he also worked on the James LaBrie record Static Impulse as guitar player, co-writer and engineer. He released his second solo album in 2012, titled reMarcoble and edited by JTC Records. In 2013 he joined the James LaBrie's band for the third time for the recording of the album Impermanent Resonance. In March 2015, he was announced as new guitar player for the Italian progressive band PFM, replacing former member Franco Mussida. Also in 2015 he announced a new band in the making with other members such as Virgil Donati on drums, Alex Argento on keyboards, and Andrea Casali on bass and vocals. The band name is Icefish, and they have released their debut album "Human Hardware" in 2017.

Equipment
Sfogli used to play Rash Guitars, a small Italian company then switches to Ibanez Guitars and played them for 10 years exclusively. He's been seen using a prototype of what would become his signature model, based on a Premium line RG shape, this guitar was out in 2016 named the Ibanez Premium RG MSM1. In 2019 a new Japanese model based on the popular AZ series has been revealed, named the MSM100. He used Mesa Boogie Amps for various recordings, then switches to Dv Mark amplification using their Triple 6 then their Multiamp digital processor. During 2016 he played Victory amps for the first P.F.M. tours then switches to Mezzabarba amps as his main amp in 2018, he uses both the MZero Overdrive and the Skill; in 2019 he switches to a rack config using the new Mezzabarba Nivrana Preamp alongside a VHT 2:50:2 poweramp and a Fractal FX8 for his effects. In the studio he's been using both the Fractal Audio products and Kemper Profiling amplifier. In July 2020 he announces the switch to Charvel/Jackson Guitars

Guitars:

-Rash Custom Guitars "Marco Sfogli models"

-Ibanez RG Premium RG920QM

-Ibanez RG Prestige RG752

-Ibanez RGDIX7MPB-SBB Iron Label

-Ibanez RG2750QV-TAB Prestige

-Ibanez RG28020ZD LTD

-Ibanez Prestige RG2027XL-DTB

-Ibanez Prestige RG-MS1 Custom

-Ibanez RG MSM L.A.C.S Custom build (Signature Prototype)

-Ibanez Prestige AZ2402 TFF

-Ibanez RG MSM1 (Marco Sfogli Signature Model) (Premium Line)

-Ibanez AZ MSM100 (Marco Sfogli Signature Model) (Prestige Line)

-Charvel Pro-Mod So-Cal Style 1 HSS FR M Satin Burgundy Mist (with EMG 85/SLV/SLV Pickups Set)

-Charvel Pro-Mod So-Cal Style 1 HSS FR M Satin Shell Pink (with EMG 85/SA/SA Pickups Set)

-Charvel Henrik Danhage Limited Edition Signature Pro-Mod So-Cal Style 1 (with EMG Crossroads/Super 77 Pickups Set)

-Jackson Pro Series Dinky DK Modern Ash FR7 Baked Green (with EMG 81/60 Pickups Set)

-Charvel Pro-Mod DK24 HSH 2PT CM Mystic Blue

-Charvel Custom Shop So-Cal Style 1 HSS FR

-Charvel Marco Sfogli Signature Pro-Mod So-Cal Style 1 HSS FR CM QM-Transparent Purple Burst

Amps:

-Mesa Boogie Mark V

-Mesa Boogie Triple Rectifier

-Mesa Boogie Dual Rectifier

-Mesa Boogie Lonestar

-Mesa Boogie Rectifier Rack Preamp

-Mesa Boogie Triaxis Preamp

-Mesa Boogie Stereo 2:90 Poweramp

-ENGL Fireball

-DV Mark Triple 6

-Victory V30 the Countess

-Victory KX the Kraken

-Mezzabarba MZero Overdrive Head

-Mezzabarba Skill 30 Head

-Mezzabarba Nirvana Preamp

-Mezzabarba Trinity 100W

Effects/Processor:

-Kemper profiler

-Fractal FM3

-Fractal FX8

-TC Electronic TC2290-DT

Other Equipment:

-Mission Engineering Pedals

-Dunlop DVP4

-Line 6 G30 Wireless

-BOSS WAZA Tube Amp Expander

-Suhr Reactive Load IR

-Live Play Rock: Marco Sfogli KEMPER PACK Signature

On records

James LaBrie "Elements of Persuasion" - Mesa Boogie Dual Rectifier 2ch - Mesa Boogie Mark III blue stripes - Mesa Boogie Tremoverb
Alex Argento "EGO" - Mesa Boogie Triaxis/2:90 - Boss GT-6 - Roland Microcube
The Alchemist II - Mesa Boogie Triaxis
Magni Animi Viri "Heroes Temporis" - Mesa Boogie Triaxis/2:90 - Mesa Boogie Studio Preamp/2:90
Jordan Rudess "The Road Home" - Native Instruments Guitar Rig - was also the last record which featured the Music Man JP guitar
John Macaluso "The Radio Waves Goodbye" - Mesa Boogie Triaxis/2:90 - Lexicon MPXG2
Shadrane "Temporal" - Boss GT-6
Marco Sfogli "There's Hope" - Mesa Boogie Studio Preamp/Triaxis/2:90 - Mesa Boogie Lonestar - Native Instruments Guitar Rig - Boss GT-6 - IK Multimedia Amplitube - Roland Microcube - Behringer VAmp2 - Lexicon MPXG2
Project Damage Control "Mechanism" - Mesa Boogie Studio Preamp/2:90 - Digidesign Eleven - Zoom 9002 Pro - Fractal Audio Axe FX Ultra
Adam Nitti "Liminal" - Mesa Boogie Lonestar - Zoom 9002 Pro
Utopia "Ice and Knives" - Fractal Audio Axe FX Ultra
James LaBrie "Static Impulse" - Mesa Boogie Dual Rectifier - Engl Fireball - Fractal Audio Axe FX Ultra

Discography 
As A Player

 NCCP (Nuova Compagnia Di Canto Popolare) - La voce del grano (2001)
 Marco Fasano - e già...! (2003)
 NCCP (Nuova Compagnia Di Canto Popolare) - Candelora (2005)
 James LaBrie - Elements of Persuasion (2005)
 Magni Animi Viri - Heroes Temporis (2006)
 Jordan Rudess - The Road Home (2007) (Guitar on "Dance On A Volcano")
 The Alchemist II - The Alchemist II (2007)
 Alex Argento - EGO (2007)
 John Macaluso & Union Radio - Radio Waves Goodbye (2007)
 Shadrane - Temporal (2009)
 Adam Nitti - Liminal (2009) (Guitar on "The Reinassance Man/Rebirth" and "Distraction")
 Project Damage Control - Mechanism (2010)
 Utopia - Ice and Knives (2010)
 Creation's End - A New Beginning (2010)
 James LaBrie - Static Impulse (2010)
 Soul Secret - Closer To Daylight (2011) (Guitar solo on "River's Edge")
 Dino Fiorenza - It's Important (2011) (Guitars on Mr. Vester)
 Guitar Addiction - A Tribute to Modern Guitar (2011)
 Various Artists - Jason Becker's Not Dead Yet! (Live in Haarlem) (2012)
 Virgil Donati - In This Life (2012)
 Neural FX - Abreaction (2012) (Second guitar solo on "Matter of Time")
 Ray Riendeau - Transcend (Song) (2012)
 James LaBrie - Impermanent Resonance (2013)
 LALU - Atomic Ark (2013)
 Nathan Frost - synecron (2013)
 Creation's End - Metaphysical (2014)
 Alberto Rigoni - Overloaded (2014)
 Widek - Hidden Dimensions (2017) (Guitar on "Deep & Shallow")
 Icefish - Human Hardware (2017)
 Premiata Forneria Marconi - Emotional Tattoos (2017)
 Richard Henshall - The Cocoon (2019)
Virgil Donati - Ruination (2019)
Intervals - Circadian (2020)
Cody Carpenter - Memories And Dreams (2020)
 James LaBrie - Beautiful Shade of Grey (2022)

Solo Albums
 Marco Sfogli - There's Hope (2008)
 Marco Sfogli - reMarcoble (2012)
 Marco Sfogli - Homeland (2019)

References

External links
 Marco Sfogli official website

Italian rock guitarists
Italian male guitarists
1980 births
Living people
Italian guitarists
21st-century guitarists
21st-century Italian male musicians
Premiata Forneria Marconi members